Luís Carlos Gaspar dos Santos Ribeiro  (born 19 April 1992) is a Portuguese professional footballer who plays for Amora as a goalkeeper.

Club career
Born in Lisbon, Ribeiro joined Sporting CP's academy at the age of 9. After loans to lower league clubs Sertanense F.C. and A.D. Camacha, he signed a professional contract until June 2018 with a €45 million buyout clause. He spent three full seasons with Sporting's reserves in the Segunda Liga, playing his first match in the competition on 6 December 2012 and being sent off in injury time of the 3–2 away loss against C.F. União.

Ribeiro was loaned to Recreativo de Huelva in the Spanish Segunda División B on 15 August 2015, moving alongside teammates Kikas and Mica Pinto. He returned to his country in the next transfer window, joining second-tier C.D. Feirense also on loan.

On 11 May 2016, Ribeiro agreed to a three-year deal with G.D. Estoril Praia. He made his Primeira Liga debut on 11 February 2017, in a 2–1 home victory over F.C. Paços de Ferreira. He added six appearances in that season's Taça de Portugal, helping his team reach the semi-finals.

Ribeiro returned to division two in January 2018, and stayed there the following years, with Real SC, Leixões SC, F.C. Penafiel and U.D. Vilafranquense.

International career
Ribeiro, Tiago Maia and Mika were the three goalkeepers selected by Portugal manager Ilídio Vale for the 2011 FIFA U-20 World Cup in Colombia. The latter played all the games and minutes in Colombia, in a runner-up finish.

On 14 November 2012, Ribeiro won his first cap at under-21 level, featuring 45 minutes in a 3–2 friendly defeat of Scotland held in Setúbal.

Honours
Portugal U20
FIFA U-20 World Cup runner-up: 2011

Orders
 Knight of the Order of Prince Henry

References

External links

1992 births
Living people
Portuguese footballers
Footballers from Lisbon
Association football goalkeepers
Primeira Liga players
Liga Portugal 2 players
Segunda Divisão players
Sporting CP B players
Sporting CP footballers
Sertanense F.C. players
C.D. Feirense players
G.D. Estoril Praia players
Real S.C. players
Leixões S.C. players
F.C. Penafiel players
U.D. Vilafranquense players
Amora F.C. players
Segunda División B players
Recreativo de Huelva players
Portugal youth international footballers
Portugal under-21 international footballers
Portuguese expatriate footballers
Expatriate footballers in Spain
Portuguese expatriate sportspeople in Spain